Andrea Belloni  (died 1577) was a Roman Catholic prelate who served as Bishop of Massa Lubrense (1560–1577).

Biography
On 27 June 1560, he was appointed during the papacy of Pope Pius IV as Bishop of Massa Lubrense.
He served as Bishop of Massa Lubrense until his death in 1577.

References

External links and additional sources
 (for Chronology of Bishops) 
 (for Chronology of Bishops) 

1577 deaths
16th-century Italian Roman Catholic bishops
Bishops appointed by Pope Pius IV